St George's, Hanover Square, is an Anglican church, the parish church of Mayfair in the City of Westminster, central London, built in the early eighteenth century as part of a project to build fifty new churches around London (the Queen Anne Churches). The church was designed by John James; its site was donated by General William Steuart, who laid the first stone in 1721.  The building is one small block south of Hanover Square, near Oxford Circus. Because of its location, it has frequently been the venue for society weddings.

Ecclesiastical parish
A civil parish of St George Hanover Square and an ecclesiastical parish were created in 1724 from part of the ancient parish of St Martin in the Fields. The boundaries of the ecclesiastical parish were adjusted in 1830, 1835 and 1865 when other parishes were carved out of it. The ecclesiastical parish still exists today and forms part of the Deanery of Westminster St Margaret in the Diocese of London.

Architecture

The land for the church was donated by General Sir William Steuart. The church was constructed in 1721–1725, funded by the Commission for Building Fifty New Churches, and designed by John James, who had been one of the two surveyors to the commission since 1716.  Its portico, supported by six Corinthian columns, projects across the pavement. There is a tower just behind the portico, rising from the roof above the west end of the nave.

The interior is divided into nave and aisles by piers, square up to the height of the galleries, then rising to the ceiling in the form of Corinthian columns. The nave has a barrel vault, and the aisles transverse barrel vaults.

Burial ground

St George's was opened in the new residential development of Hanover Square with no attached churchyard. Its first burial ground was sited beside its workhouse at Mount Street. When this filled up a larger burial ground was consecrated at Bayswater in 1765. They were closed for burials in 1854, when London's city churchyards were closed to protect public health. Burials at St George's included Mrs Ann Radcliffe (1764–1823), an influential female writer of the "Gothic Novel", the Revd. Laurence Sterne (1713–1768), abolitionist and author of Tristram Shandy, and Francis Nicholson, British military officer and colonial administrator.

The Mount Street ground was later cleared of monuments and turned into a small park. Some of the old tombstones were used for guttering and drainage, and may be seen today. During the First World War the Bayswater ground was covered with 4' of top soil and used for growing vegetables. In 1969 the burial ground was cleared to enable land to be sold off for redevelopment. A skull, part anatomised, was conjectured to be Sterne's and a partial skeleton separated from the other remains to be transferred to Coxwold churchyard by the Laurence Sterne Trust. 11,500 further remains were taken to West Norwood Cemetery and cremated, for burial there.

In popular culture
In Chapter 43 of Jane Austen's 1814 novel Mansfield Park "perhaps you would not mind passing through London, and seeing the inside of St. George's, Hanover Square".

In the William Makepeace Thackeray 1844  novel The Luck of Barry Lyndon the protagonist, Redmond Barry, weds the Countess of Lyndon at St George's, Hanover Square.

In the Sherlock Holmes 1892 story The Adventure of the Noble Bachelor it is the setting of the wedding of the eponymous Lord St Simon and American Hatty Doran, whose disappearance sparks Holmes' investigation.

In the musical My Fair Lady (1956), Alfred Doolittle (Stanley Holloway), having just been provided with an inheritance and having to move into "middle-class morality", invites his daughter Eliza Doolittle (Audrey Hepburn) to his wedding at this church.  Following the invitation, he and his fellows sing "Get Me to the Church on Time".

The church is mentioned as the venue for the forthcoming marriage of Iris Henderson in The Lady Vanishes.

In the Dorothy Sayers novel Busman's Honeymoon, Lord Peter Wimsey's sister-in-law (without consulting him) seeks to have his upcoming wedding held at St George's, Hanover Square.

In Chapter 2 of The Return of the Soldier by Rebecca West, it is mentioned that Chris and Kitty got married in this church in February of 1906.

Music

Handel was a regular worshipper at St George's, which is now one of the venues used by the annual London Handel Festival. He used to play the organ, and wrote Messiah in the church. St. George's has a full-time professional choir and a strong choral tradition and is a venue for classical music concerts. A Restoration Fund Appeal was launched on Trinity Sunday 2006 to raise a total of five million pounds, with a target of one and a half million pounds needed for the first phase of essential restoration work to the fabric of the church. A recent concert series in support of the Restoration Fund was supported by the William Smith International Performance Programme and featured solo piano performances by students from the Royal College of Music, including Ren Yuan, Ina Charuashvili, Meng Yan Pan and the London debut of Maria Nemtsova of Russia.

The church is one of the two main bases of the Orpheus Sinfonia, an orchestra of players recently graduated from music colleges.

Rectors
The following have served as rector of St George's, Hanover Square:

1725–1759† Andrew Trebeck
1759–1774 Charles Moss (as Bishop of St David's 1766–74, later Bishop of Bath and Wells)
1774–1803† Henry Reginald Courtenay (as Bishop of Bristol 1794–97, Bishop & Archdeacon of Exeter 1797–1803)
1803–1844† Robert Hodgson (as Archdeacon of St Alban's 1814–16, Dean of Chester 1816–20, Dean of Carlisle 1820–44)
1845–1876† Henry Howarth
1876–1890† Edward Capel Cure
1891–1911 David Anderson
1911–1933 Norman Thicknesse (as Archdeacon of Middlesex 1930–33)
1933–1940 Henry Montgomery Campbell (later Bishop of Willesden, Kensington, Guildford, and London)
1940–1955 Stephen Phillimore (as Archdeacon of Middlesex 1933–53)
1955–2000 William Maynard Atkins
2001–2004† John Slater
2005– Roderick Leece

† Rector died in post

Weddings
From its early days, the church was a fashionable place for weddings, which have included those of:

Sir Francis Dashwood, founder of the second Hellfire Club, later Chancellor of the Exchequer, and Sarah, daughter of George Gould of Iver, Buckinghamshire, and widow of Sir Richard Ellis, Baronet, on 19 December 1745.
Viscount Stopford and Mary Powys, 19 April 1762
Henry Holland and Bridget Brown, a daughter of Capability Brown, on 11 February 1773. 
William Hodges and Martha Bowden Nesbit, on 11 May 1776.
The botanist and antiquary Edward Rudge (1763-1846) married the botanical illustrator Anne Rudge here in 1791.
John Nash, architect, and Mary Ann Bradley on 17 December 1798. 
John Shaw (1776–1832), architect, and Elizabeth Hester Whitfield in 1799. 
Sackville Tufton, 9th Earl of Thanet, and Anne Charlotte de Bojanowitz, on 28 February 1811
Joseph Wolff (1795–1862), German-born Christian convert, known as “the missionary to the world”, in 1827. 
Sir John Ogilvy, 9th Baronet, and Juliana Barbara, a daughter of Lord Henry Howard-Molyneux-Howard, on 7 July 1831.
Theodore Roosevelt, future United States President, aged 28, and Edith Carow, aged 25, on 2 December 1886.
Leopold Albu, of 4 Hamilton Place, Mayfair, the brother of Sir George Albu, to Adelaide Veronica Elizabeth Burton, daughter of Edgar Henry Burton, and granddaughter of Henry Marley Burton, on 19 August 1901.
Alfreda Ernestina Albertina Bowen, daughter of Sir George Ferguson Bowen and Diamantina, Contessa di Roma, and Robert Lydston Newman, in October 1899. 
Euphemia Dunsmuir, daughter of Robert Dunsmuir, and Somerset Gough-Calthorpe, February 27, 1900
 John Galsworthy, Nobel Prize in Literature recipient and Ada Nemesis Cooper on 23rd September 1905 after a 10-year affair.
Henry Hall, band leader, and Margery Harker, a girl he had met on a train, January 1924.
The actress Charlotte Wattell married Thomas Sandon here in 1799.

High society weddings at St. George's Hanover Square fell in numbers in the late 20th century, a social change discreetly mentioned in the obituary of the Reverend W. M. Atkins, Rector of St George's from 1955 to 2000.

References

External links

Parish data (Vision of Britain)
http://www.stgeorgeshanoversquare.org/
Deanery of Westminster (St Margaret)
 Mystery Worshipper Report at the Ship of Fools website

Buildings and structures in Mayfair
Church of England church buildings in the City of Westminster
Diocese of London
Burials at West Norwood Cemetery
18th-century Church of England church buildings
Grade I listed churches in the City of Westminster
John James (architect) buildings